LeVert was an R&B vocal group, formed in 1984 by brothers Gerald and Sean Levert.

Levert or LeVert may also refer to:
 Levert, Alabama, unincorporated community in Perry County, Alabama, United States

People with the surname Levert
 Caris LeVert (born 1994), American basketball player
 Charles Levert (1825–1899), French public servant and politician
 Eddie Levert, (born 1942), American singer, lead vocalist of The O'Jays and father of Gerald and Sean Levert
 Gerald Levert, (1966–2006), American R&B singer
 Léopold Levert (1819–1882), French artist 
Mireille Levert (born 1956), Canadian writer
 Sean Levert, (1968–2008), American R&B singer

People with the given name Levert
 Levert Carr (born 1944), American football player

See also
Lavert, given name